Thomas Martin Lindsay FRSE (1843–1914) was a Scottish historian, professor and principal of the Free Church College, Glasgow. He wrote chiefly on church history, his major works including Luther and the German Reformation (1900), and A History of the Reformation (1906–1907).

Life
He was born on 18 October 1843 in Lesmahagow in Lanarkshire, the eldest son of Rev. Alexander Lindsay, and his wife, Susan Irvine Martin. He was educated in Lesmahagow.

Lindsay studied divinity at the University of Glasgow and then at the University of Edinburgh. In 1869 he entered the ministry of the Free Church of Scotland, and in 1872 was appointed Professor of Church History at the Free Church College, Glasgow. He was then living at "Thornliebank" on Ann Street in the Hillhead district when he married Anna Dunlop. Anna Lindsay had just been a student in Edinburgh.

Lindsay took up the position of Principal of the College in 1902. He then moved to the more affluent address of 37 Westbourne Gardens in Kelvinside, an attractive three-storey and basement Victorian terraced house.

He was a founder member of the Glasgow and West of Scotland Association for Women's Suffrage

Lindsay unsuccessfully supported William Robertson Smith in a trial for heresy between 1877 and 1881 which resulted in Smith's losing his position at the Aberdeen Free Church College.
He died in Glasgow on 6 December 1912.

Publications
The Critical Movement in the Free Church of Scotland (1879)
The Reformation (1882)
Luther and the German Reformation (1900)
The Church and the Ministry in the Early Centuries (1902)
The New Testament (1906)
A History of the Reformation (two volumes, 1906–1907)
An Oxford Bookseller in 1520 (1907)
Englishmen and the Classical Renaissance (1909)

He was a contributor to Encyclopædia Britannica and to the Cambridge Modern History.

Family
Lindsay married Anna Dunlop. The Glasgow Association for the Higher Education of Women was started at the suggestion of Mrs Jean Campbell in 1868. Anna Lindsay was one of its founders. Lindsay's name was said to be synonymous with the women's movement in Scotland. Their children included Alexander Lindsay, 1st Baron Lindsay of Birker, Professor of Moral Philosophy in the University of Glasgow, Master of Balliol College, and Vice-Chancellor of the University of Oxford.

Notes

External links

 
Thomas Martin Lindsay portrait by George Fiddes Watt at bbc.co.uk

1843 births
1914 deaths
Alumni of the University of Glasgow
Alumni of the University of Edinburgh
Reformation historians
People from Lanarkshire
20th-century Scottish historians
Scottish suffragists
19th-century Scottish historians